Anne MacLeod (born 1951) is a Scottish writer.

She was born in Aberfeldy and grew up in Inverness. MacLeod studied medicine at the University of Aberdeen and works as a dermatologist. She is the mother of four children. MacLeod lives on the Black Isle.

She has published two collections of poetry:
 Standing by Thistles (1997)
 Just the Caravaggio (1999)
both of which were well-received by critics. She has also published two novels The Dark Ship (2001) and The Blue Moon Book (2004).

References 

1951 births
Living people
Scottish women poets
Scottish women novelists